Vidra may refer to the following places:

 Romania
Vidra, Alba, a commune in Alba County
Vidra, Ilfov, a commune in Ilfov County
Vidra, Vrancea, a commune in Vrancea County
Vidra, a village in Vârfurile Commune, Arad County
Vidra Lake, a reservoir in Vâlcea County
 Vidra, a tributary of the Lotru in Vâlcea County
 Vidra (Putna), a tributary of the Putna in Vrancea County

 Other countries
 Vidrà, a municipality in Catalonia, Spain

See also
 
Vydra (disambiguation)
Wydra (disambiguation)